Scott Mark Doe (born 6 November 1988) is an English semi-professional footballer who plays as a defender for Romford.

Doe started his career with Swindon Town as a youth player before joining Conference Premier club Weymouth. In February 2009, he left Weymouth due to financial problems at the club and registered with Kettering Town to allow him to join Dagenham & Redbridge on loan until the end of the 2008–09 season. He was refused permission to join Dagenham on a permanent basis by The Football Association as the move was outside the transfer window. Doe has also represented the England C team, making one appearance against Malta under-21s.

Early career
Doe was born in Reading, Berkshire. As a youth player, he played as a forward for AFC Newbury and Newbury and District Schools alongside Theo Walcott, before the duo signed for Swindon Town. They played together for four years. He said in one season, that his partnership with Walcott consisted of them scoring about 150 goals. During a tournament in Cardiff, Doe was converted into a centre-back. Doe was with Swindon Town from the age of 10, until he was deemed surplus to requirements by manager Paul Sturrock, and he left in July 2007.

Club career

Weymouth
Doe joined Conference Premier club Weymouth on 1 July 2007, along with Swindon Town youth teammate Jon Stewart, where he signed a one-year contract. His debut for Weymouth was in the 3–0 home win during a pre-season friendly against League Two side Bournemouth on 17 July. He made his competitive debut for his new club on 15 September in the 3–1 away win at Droylsden, replacing Conal Platt as a substitute in the 65th minute. Doe's first start for Weymouth was against Torquay United on 25 September, in their 3–2 away defeat. His first goal for the club was scored on 26 January 2008, away at Rushden & Diamonds, as Weymouth were defeated 3–2. Paolo Vernazza took a free kick in the 25th minute after Stuart Beavon was fouled just outside the penalty area by Curtis Osano. Doe scored with a header, which took a slight deflection as the ball crossed the goal line. During Weymouth's 2–1 away defeat on 1 March to Halifax Town, Doe was controversially sent off three minutes into stoppage time. He was sent off for a tackle on Andy Campbell, but manager John Hollins claimed "there is no doubt that Scott got the ball". Weymouth finished the season in 18th position, defying relegation, with Doe ending the 2007–08 season having made 33 appearances in the Conference, scoring once. Doe won the "Supporters Player of The Year" award, describing it as "the best thing in the World". He admitted he did not expect to play more than 15 games during the season, saying "when I first came to the club I thought I might play 15 games throughout the whole season but I have ended up playing over twice that and it has just been fantastic" stated Doe.

Along with Anton Robinson, Marcus Browning and Stuart Beavon, Doe signed a new contract with Weymouth in May 2008. His only goal for Weymouth in the 2008–09 season was against Forest Green Rovers on 25 August, after scoring the equalizer to make the score 1–1 in the 71st minute, with a tap-in following a cross from Ryan Williams. In September, Doe was transfer listed, alongside James Coutts, Danny Knowles, Josh Webb and Michael Malcolm to generate money and bring new players to the club. He responded to being transfer listed by saying "I do not see it as a big deal. It's not like the club has said to me we are putting you on the transfer list because we do not want you anymore", and suggested it could benefit both parties if a bigger club were willing to "pay a bit of money". On 4 October, Doe was sent off in Weymouth's 3–2 home win over Eastbourne Borough, after he committed a foul on Andy Atkin in the penalty area, which resulted in a penalty kick that was later saved. Southern League Premier Division club Farnborough approached Doe on 30 December. He turned the offer down saying; "moving to Farnborough would mean stepping down two levels which is not what I want to do". His last game for Weymouth was against Stevenage Borough on 14 February, in the 3–0 home defeat.

Dagenham & Redbridge
Doe agreed to sign for League Two side Dagenham & Redbridge on a two-and-a-half-year contract in February 2009, initially on loan. He was also offered a contract at League One club Peterborough United. Financial troubles at Weymouth resulted in a number of first-team players not being paid. Due to the situation at Weymouth, The Football Association gave him special dispensation to move anywhere, although the Football League refused to allow him to join Dagenham as it was outside the transfer window. Subsequently, Doe registered for another Conference Premier team, Kettering Town, and joined Dagenham on an emergency loan until the end of the 2008–09 season. He signed for Dagenham on a permanent basis on a two-and-a-half-year contract in March. He made his debut on the opening day of the 2009–10 season, after starting in a 2–1 victory over Crewe Alexandra. At the end of the season, Doe was runner-up to Mark Arber for Dagenham & Redbridge's "Player of the Year" award. In June 2015, Doe rejected a new contract extension and left the club having made 266 appearances, scoring 11 goals.

Boreham Wood
After leaving Dagenham & Redbridge, Doe signed for newly promoted National League side Boreham Wood in July 2015.

Return to Dagenham and later career
In May 2016, he re-signed for Dagenham & Redbridge after their relegation to the National League along with Luke Howell on a free transfer, re-uniting with former manager John Still. 

In February 2018, Doe was released by the Daggers and briefly joined Brighton-based National League South side Whitehawk, before signing once more for Boreham Wood. In July 2018, he signed for Billericay Town. On 8 December 2018, Doe signed for Dover Athletic after leaving Billericay where he made 13 league appearances, scoring one goal. On 23 January 2021, Doe signed for National League South side Welling United. In August 2021, Doe joined Hythe Town. 

In March 2022, Doe left Hythe Town to join Barnstaple Town. Doe was released from Barnstaple however after just two weeks, and subsequently returned to Kent to sign for Whitstable Town.

In July 2022, he was training with Sheppey United and has played for them in the pre-season leading up to the 2022–23 Isthmian League season. Ahead of the new season, Doe returned to Romford.

International career
Doe was called up to the England C squad in February 2009, by manager Paul Fairclough, to face the Malta under-21 team. He came on as a second-half substitute in the 4–0 victory at Hibernians Football Ground, Paola, on 17 February.

Style of play
Doe is able to play as a centre-back or full-back and is a "strong player" with good positional sense.

Career statistics

References

External links

1988 births
Living people
Sportspeople from Reading, Berkshire
English footballers
England semi-pro international footballers
Association football defenders
Swindon Town F.C. players
Weymouth F.C. players
Kettering Town F.C. players
Dagenham & Redbridge F.C. players
Boreham Wood F.C. players
Whitehawk F.C. players
Billericay Town F.C. players
Dover Athletic F.C. players
Romford F.C. players
Welling United F.C. players
Hythe Town F.C. players
Barnstaple Town F.C. players
Whitstable Town F.C. players
National League (English football) players
English Football League players
Isthmian League players
Footballers from Berkshire